Johnson Hagood may refer to:

Johnson Hagood (governor) (1828–1898), American Civil War soldier and Governor of South Carolina, 1880–1882
Johnson Hagood (1873–1948), American World War I general

See also
Johnson Hagood Stadium, Charleston, South Carolina